Elektrani na Severna Makedonija or ESM (litt. "Power plants of North Macedonia") is a government-owned electricity producing company in North Macedonia.

History 

In 2005, the former state monopoly ESM ( [], litt. Electricity of Macedonia) was split in three companies:
 A state-owned power-producing company ELEM ( [], litt. Power plants of Macedonia), in charge of the country's power plants
 A distribution and supply company, initially called ESM AD, sold in 2006 to Austrian EVN Group and renamed as EVN Macedonia, rebranded in 2019 as EVN AD Skopje.
 A state-owned transmission system operator MEPSO

In March 2019, ELEM was renamed as ESM (Power plants of North Macedonia) after the country renamed itself as North Macedonia with the implementation of the Prespa agreement, reverting to the previous initialism used between 1990 and 2006.

Structure 
As of 2020, ESM has the following operations:
 Power production facilities
 TPP Bitola, coal (lignite) mine and power plant combine which also runs the Suvodol coal mine and produces 72% of the electricity of the country
 TPP Oslomej, coal (lignite) mine and power plant combine
 Tikveš Hydroelectric Power Station
 Treska Hydroelectric System, including the Kozjak and   hydro power plants
 Energetika, a natural gas facility providing electricity, steam and heating water to the ironworks complex in 
 Other companies
 ELEM Tours (ELEM TURS): tourism, catering, recreation and sport
 ELEM Trade (ELEM TREJD)
 FOD Bitola: factory equipment and parts
 FORD Oslomej: factory maintenance, overhaul and transport

References

Electric power companies of North Macedonia
Government-owned companies of North Macedonia
Government-owned energy companies